Marcus Gheeraerts may refer to:

Marcus Gheeraerts the Elder (c. 1520 – c. 1590), Flemish engraver and illustrator
Marcus Gheeraerts the Younger (1562–1635), English portrait painter and son of the above